Mike Adriano (born 30 June 1983) is a pornographic actor and director. He has been nominated for best director awards at several recent AVN Award, XBIZ Award and XRCO Award ceremonies.

Gonzo pornography 

Adriano is recognized as a major director in the genre of hardcore gonzo pornography. Some of the distinctive characteristics of his work: a very liberal use of lubricants, very lengthy scenes (over one hour), and graphic focus on the purely physical aspects of sex.

Influence 

Porn star and director Bonnie Rotten has credited Adriano with inspiring and encouraging her to direct. Porn star Candice Dare has expressed her liking for working with Adriano.

Awards 

2012 AVN Award winner — Best Oral Release — American Cocksucking Sluts
2012 AVN Award winner — Most Outrageous Sex Scene — American Cocksucking Sluts (director — Mike Adriano/Evil Angel) with Brooklyn Lee & Juelz Ventura
2012 AVN Award winner — Best Oral Sex Scene — American Cocksucking Sluts (director — Mike Adriano/Evil Angel) with Brooklyn Lee & Juelz Ventura
2013 AVN Award winner — Best Oral Release — American Cocksucking Sluts 2 (Mike Adriano/Evil Angel)

References

External links 

1980 births
Living people
Spanish male pornographic film actors
Spanish pornographic film directors